Mind over Matter is the ninth studio album by British band The Nightingales. It was
recorded in September 2014 at the Faust Studio, Scheer, Germany.

Track listing 
 "For Goodness Sake"
 "The Only Son"
 "'The Man That Time Forgot"
 "Ripe Old Age"
 "Taffy Come Home"
 "For Different Folks"
 "Stroke Of Genius"
 "I Itch"
 "But..."
 "Gales Doc"
 "Great British Exports"
 "Bit Of Rough"

Personnel 
 Robert Lloyd – Vocals
 Alan Apperley – Guitars
 Fliss Kitson – Drums, vocals
 Andreas Schmid - Bass

Reception 
Joe Shooman of Record Collector awarded the album 4/5 and wrote
"Mind Over Matter's sleazy rockabilly nightmares and Captain Beefheart-channeling psychedelic detours are entirely keeping with the group's '80s records".
Uncut also rated the album 4/5 and said "This Terrific follow-up is even better, the quartet unloading a clamorous set of songs full of pique, provocation and waspish humour".

References

External links 
Official artist website

2015 albums
The Nightingales albums
Alternative rock albums by British artists